Ahmadabad (also Romanized as Aḩmadābād) is a village in Abgarm Rural District, Abgarm District, Avaj County, Qazvin Province, Iran. At the 2006 census, its population was 244, in 59 families.

References 

Populated places in Avaj County